William Montgomery (April 11, 1818 – April 28, 1870) was a Democratic member of the U.S. House of Representatives from Pennsylvania.

William Montgomery was born in Canton Township, Pennsylvania.  He pursued classical studies and was graduated from Washington College (now Washington and Jefferson College) in Washington, Pennsylvania, in 1839.  He studied law, was admitted to the bar in 1841 and commenced practice in Washington.  He served as district attorney in 1845.  He was an unsuccessful candidate for election in 1854.

Montgomery was elected as a Democrat to the Thirty-fifth and Thirty-sixth Congresses.  He was not a candidate for renomination in 1860.  He was a delegate to the 1860 Democratic National Convention.  He resumed the practice of law.  He was again an unsuccessful candidate for election to Congress in 1866.   He died in Washington in 1870.  Interment in Washington Cemetery.

Sources

The Political Graveyard

1818 births
1870 deaths
Washington & Jefferson College alumni
Pennsylvania lawyers
People from Washington County, Pennsylvania
Democratic Party members of the United States House of Representatives from Pennsylvania
19th-century American politicians
19th-century American lawyers